Alle De Wolde (born 27 December 1955) is a former Australian rules footballer who played for Hawthorn in the VFL.

A back pocket specialist, De Wolde arrived at Hawthorn from Box Hill and was a member of Hawthorn's 1978 premiership side.  De Wolde was a handy reserves player for his final few years at the club along with other veterans like Turner, Wade, Goad and Moncrieff.

References

1955 births
Living people
Hawthorn Football Club players
Hawthorn Football Club Premiership players
Australian rules footballers from Victoria (Australia)
One-time VFL/AFL Premiership players